Pope House was a historic home located near Clinton, Sampson County, North Carolina.   It was built about 1846, and was a -story, three bay by two bay, central hall plan, frame dwelling with a Late Federal style interior.  It had a side gable roof, rear ell with an enlarged porch, and a gable front porch supported by four Tuscan order columns. It has been demolished.

It was added to the National Register of Historic Places in 1986.

References

Houses on the National Register of Historic Places in North Carolina
Federal architecture in North Carolina
Houses completed in 1846
Houses in Sampson County, North Carolina
National Register of Historic Places in Sampson County, North Carolina